Reprise is the repetition of a passage in music.

Reprise may also refer to:

 Reprise (fencing)
 Reprise (film), a 2006 Norwegian film
 Reprise (Russell Watson album), a 2002 album by Russell Watson
 Reprise (Moby album), a 2021 album by Moby
 Reprise 1990–1999, a 1999 compilation album by Vangelis
 "Reprise" (Angel), a 2001 episode of the television program Angel
 La Reprise, a novel by Alain Robbe-Grillet
 "Reprise", a song by Phase, from The Wait (Phase album)
 Reprise Records, a record label founded by Frank Sinatra
 "Reprise", a song by the Sword from the album Used Future

See also
Reprisal